Troy Heinert (born July 29, 1972) is an American politician who served in the South Dakota Senate.

Elected to the Senate in 2014, he was elected in 2015 as Senate assistant minority leader. He was elected minority leader in 2018. He was first elected to the state house in 2012 and served for one term.

Early life and education
Heinert was born in Spearfish, South Dakota. He grew up on a ranch. His father died when he was 12, but he was taken under the wing of a close family friend. He attended local schools, where he graduated with a BS degree in education. He is a member of the Rosebud Sioux Tribe.

Career
Heinert started work as an elementary school teacher, working also as a wrestling coach.

He first ran for electoral office on the Todd County High School Board, winning a seat and serving for 3 years.

Heinert and his wife in 2007 became owners of Chute 2, a bar and restaurant attached to the Prairie View country club in Mission. He became close to Jim Korkow, who was friends with his father, especially after his father's death. Korkow has acted as a father to him.

In 2012, Heinert was elected as a Democrat to the South Dakota House of Representatives from District 26A, comprising Todd and Mellette counties.

In 2014, Heinert was elected to the state senate.

He was succeeded in the house from District 26A by Shawn Bordeaux also of Mission.

Personal life
He married Gena and they have two sons and a daughter. They lived in Mission, South Dakota.

References

External links
 

1972 births
21st-century American politicians
Living people
Democratic Party members of the South Dakota House of Representatives
Native American state legislators in South Dakota
People from Spearfish, South Dakota
People from Mission, South Dakota
Rosebud Sioux people
Democratic Party South Dakota state senators